The Baylor Bears softball team represents Baylor University in NCAA Division I softball. They play their home games at Getterman Stadium in Waco, Texas. The team's current head coach is Glenn Moore, a position he's held since the 2000 season.

Championships

Conference Championships

Coaching staff

Notable players

Conference awards
Big 12 Pitcher of the Year
Whitney Canion (2009)
Whitney Canion (2014)

Big 12 Freshman of the Year
Brette Reagan (2006)
Kirsten Shortridge (2007)
Whitney Canion (2009)
Sarah Smith (2013)

Big 12 Defensive Player of the Year
Jessie Scroggins (2017)

References